Invisible Violence is the third full-length album by Canadian indie-rock band We Are Wolves, released on October 6, 2009. The song 'Holding Hands' was also featured in the soundtrack on Gran Turismo 5 released in 2010.

Track listing
 "Paloma" - 4:39
 "Holding Hands" - 2:28
 "Walking Commotion" - 4:34
 "Dreams" - 3:16
 "Vague" - 3:14
 "Reaching for the Sky" - 5:28
 "Me as Enemy" - 2:41
 "Blue" - 3:45
 "Near Fear" - 3:49
 "La Rue oblique" - 5:54
 "The Spectacle of Night" - 3:24
 "Bounty Waterfalls" - 1:59

References

We Are Wolves albums
2009 albums
Bravo Musique albums